It's Never Been Like That is the third studio album by French indie pop band Phoenix. It was released 15 May 2006 in Europe. The album was preceded by the release of the singles "Long Distance Call" and "Consolation Prizes"

The album was later re-released in Mexico as a tour edition with four bonus tracks recorded live in Oslo on 20 April 2006.

Commercial performance
As of 2013, sales in the United States have exceeded 92,000 copies, according to Nielsen SoundScan.

Critical reception

It's Never Been Like That was rated number 13 in Pitchforks Top 50 Albums of 2006 and 38 in their Top Albums of the 2000s.

Track listing

Notes
This edition of the album is referred to as the "New Edition". It was released in France and on tour in Mexico back in 2006, but is now being sold as a 2009 release in the US.
The live tracks were recorded in Oslo on 20 April 2006.

Charts

Release history

References

2006 albums
Astralwerks albums
Virgin Records albums
Arts & Crafts Productions albums
Phoenix (band) albums